Yossi Amrani (born Haifa, 1958) is an Israeli diplomat who is the Israeli Ambassador to Greece.

Biography
Amrani earned a BA and MA cum laude in history from the University of Haifa and the Hebrew University of Jerusalem, respectively.

Career
2016 - 2019 Ambassador Extraordinary and Plenipotentiary to Hungary
2014 - 2016 Head of Policy Planning Division, Ministry of Foreign Affairs
2012 - 03/2014 Non-resident Ambassador to the Republic of North Macedonia
2009 - 03/2014 Ambassador Extraordinary and Plenipotentiary to Croatia
2008 Minister, West Europe Division, Policy Analysis and Planning, Ministry of Foreign Affairs
2000-2004 Consul General based in San Francisco

References

Ambassadors of Israel to Croatia
Ambassadors of Israel to Greece
Ambassadors of Israel to Hungary
Ambassadors of Israel to North Macedonia
Hebrew University of Jerusalem alumni
University of Haifa alumni
1958 births
Living people
Israeli consuls